The 1947 Critérium du Dauphiné Libéré was the inaugural edition of the cycle race and was held from 12 June to 16 June 1947. The race started and finished in Grenoble. The race was won by Edward Klabiński of the Mercier team.

General classification

References

1947
1947 in French sport
June 1947 sports events in Europe